David Edward White (born November 26, 1938) is a retired rear admiral in the United States Navy. He was Chief of Chaplains of the United States Navy from August 1991 to August 1994. He earned an A.B. degree from Hope College in 1960 and an M.Div. degree from the New Brunswick Theological Seminary in 1963. White was commissioned as an ensign on March 5, 1962 and promoted to lieutenant (junior grade) after completing his training as a Reformed Church in America minister. He later received an M.S. degree from the Naval Postgraduate School in 1973.

References

External links

1938 births
Living people
Hope College alumni
New Brunswick Theological Seminary alumni
Reformed Church in America ministers
United States Navy chaplains
Naval Postgraduate School alumni
United States Navy admirals
Chiefs of Chaplains of the United States Navy